The 2023 UTEP Miners football team will represent University of Texas at El Paso in the 2023 NCAA Division I FBS football season. The Hilltoppers will play their home games at the Sun Bowl in El Paso, Texas, and will compete members of Conference USA. They will be led by sixth-year head coach Dana Dimel.

Schedule
UTEP and Conference USA announced the 2023 football schedule on January 10, 2023.

Transfers

References

UTEP Miners
UTEP Miners football seasons
UTEP Miners football